Maxim Dondyuk (born 1983) is a photographer and visual artist. His professional career began in Ukrainian media as a photojournalist in 2007. He has been freelance since 2010, working on creating and promoting his own documentary projects.

He is a finalist of the Prix Pictet Photography Prize, a Lucie Awards International Photographer of the Year, winner of the Prix Photo La Quatrieme Image, winner of the Ville de Perpignan Remi Ochlik Award at Visa pour l'Image, a Magnum Photos competition '30 under 30' for emerging documentary photographers, recipient of the W. Eugene Smith Grant in Humanistic Photography, finalist for the FotoEvidence Book Award, and received Grand Prix 'Best Global Health Story' of Becton Dickinson (BD)'s 'Hope for a Healthy World Photo Competition.'

Life and work
Dondyuk was born in the Ukrainian SSR. His first long-term projects Uman, Rosh Hashana (2008–2012), The Crimea Sich (2010–2013), TB epidemic in Ukraine (2010–2012) are analyses of the time, situation. Not being interested in stereotypes, he is a direct participant in the events, and uses personal experience and emotions to emphasize their basic meaning.

From the project Culture of the Confrontation (2013–2014), Dondyuk's perception of photography has changed. He began filling his works with second meaning and associational level. He doesn't want to specify the time period, the place and reasons. Through photography he wants to show eternal themes, wants people to associate his works "with their memories from reading books, music, their own life."

Dondyuk's works were presented during the festivals in Arles, Paris, Minsk and published in magazines such as: Time, Der Spiegel, Stern, Paris Match, Rolling Stone, Photo District News, Bloomberg Businessweek, Russian Reporter, Libération, Polka, 6Mois and Esquire etc. He also works with international organizations, such as International Committee of the Red Cross (ICRC) and the World Health Organization (WHO).

Publications
Culture of Confrontation. Self-published, 2019.

Awards
2011: Finalist of the Pikto International Competition.
2012: Finalist of the Photo Evidence Book Award.
2012: Grand Prix Best Global Health Story of Becton Dickinson (BD)'s Hope for a Healthy World Photo Competition.
2012: Forward Thinking Museum, finalist of 2nd quarter.
2012: Finalist for a grant of The Manuel Rivera-Ortiz Foundation for Documentary Photography & Film.
2012: Finalist for a grant of the 4th edition of the AnthropoGraphia Human Rights Through Visual Storytelling.
2012: Honourable Mention of the International Photography Awards annual competition (IPA).
2012: Forward Thinking Museum, finalist of 4th quarter.
2013: Shortlist in the Portraiture category of Sony World Photography Awards.
2013: Honorable mention of the FotoVisura Grant.
2013: Finalist of the W. Eugene Smith Grant in Humanistic Photography from W. Eugene Smith Memorial Fund.
2014: Magnum Photos competition '30 under 30' for emerging documentary photographers.
2014: Winner of the Ville de Perpignan Remi Ochlik Award.
2015: Honorable Mentions of the Photographic Museum of Humanity Grant (PHM).
2015: Winner of the Photo District News Photo Annual 2015 in documentary category.
2015: Winner of the Prix Photo La Quatrieme Image, 1st Prize.
2015: PX3 Prix de la Photographie Paris, Press War Category, 1st Prize.
2015: Voies Off, Shortlist.
2015: Prix Pictet Photography Prize is Disorder, Shortlist.
2015: Fine Art Photography Awards, 1st Place Winner in Photojournalism.
2015: Fine Art Photography Awards, Professional Fine Art Photographer of the Year.
2015: 1st place in Editorial: General News category, 13th Annual Lucie Awards (IPA).
2015: Editorial Photographer of the Year, Lucie Awards (IPA).
2015: International Photographer of the Year, Lucie Awards (IPA).
2015: International Photography Award, British Journal of Photography, Runner-up.
2015: Finalist of the LensCulture Visual Storytelling Award.
2016: JGS Photography Contest, Forward Thinking Museum, Runner-up of 4th quarter.
2016: LensCulture Exposure Awards, 3rd Prize Series.
2016: Kolga Tbilisi Photo Award, Best Documentary Series.
2016: Magnum Photography Awards, Finalist.
2022: Recipient of the W. Eugene Smith Grant in Humanistic Photography from the W. Eugene Smith Memorial Fund for his project Ukraine 2014/22

Exhibitions

Solo exhibitions
2011–2013: Uman, Rosh Hashanah, Lviv, Ukraine; Gallery Camera, Kyiv, Ukraine, 2013.
2011: TUBERCULOSIS, Center of Documentary Photography «FOTODOC» (Moscow).
2012: TB epidemic in Ukraine, Donetsk, Ukraine, 2012; Zaporozhye, Ukraine, 2012; PhotoReportAge Festival, Pomarico, Italy, 2013.
2013: Old Age, Municipal Art Gallery (Nova Kachovka, Ukraine).
2014–2015: Euromaidan: culture of the confrontation, Visa pour l'image, Pergipinan, France, 2014; Barbaros square, FotoIstanbul, Istanbul, Turkey; Orvieto Fotografia festival, Orvieto, Italia, 2015.

Group exhibitions and exhibitions during festivals
2013: Exhibition Photographer of the Year, M17 Contemporary Art Center (Kyiv, Ukraine).
2013: Showing a short documentary film Crimea Sich, American Independence Film Festival (Kyiv, Ukraine).
2014: Permanent group exhibition Maidan. Ukraine. Road to Freedom, Checkpoint Charlie Museum (Berlin).
2014: Group exhibition 30 Under 30 Winners Gallery, The Photography Show (Birmingham, UK).
2014: Group exhibition Shift: Ukraine in Crisis, Third Floor Gallery, Cardiff, UK. Photographs by Dondyuk as well as Alexander Chekmenev, Corentin Fohlen, Louisa Gouliamaki, Brendan Hoffman, Tom Jamieson, Marco Kesseler, Anastasia Taylor-Lind, Donald Weber and Emine Ziyatdinova.
2014: Group exhibition Maidan. Ukraine. Road to Freedom, Ukrainian Institute of America, New York, 2014.
2015: Group exhibition Maidan. Ukraine. Road to Freedom, The Stay Gallery, Los Angeles, 2015.
2015: Group Exhibition Battle of Ilovaisk, Museum of the History, Dniprodzerzhynsk, Ukraine.
2015: Exhibition Culture of the Confrontation as a part of Prix Pictet Disorder finalists exhibition, Musée d'Art Moderne, Paris, France; CAB Art Center, Brussels, Belgium; International Red Cross and Red Crescent Museum, Geneva, Switzerland; LUMA Westbau – Löwenbräukunst, Zurich, Switzerland; as a part of LensCulture Exposure Awards, Photo London, Somerset House, London; Athens Photo Festival, Benaki Museum, Athens, Greece; Prix Pictet Disorder finalists exhibition, The Old Municipal Gallery, Athens, Greece; Prix Pictet Disorder finalists exhibition, Bank Gallery, Tokyo.
2016: Exhibition This is War at the 5th LUMIX Festival for Young Photojournalism, Hanover, Germany; as a part of group exhibition Deformation at Suwon Photo Festival, Suwon, Korea.

References

External links

Living people
1983 births
Ukrainian photographers
Fine art photographers